Titanio safedalis is a moth in the family Crambidae. It was described by Hans Georg Amsel in 1970 and is found in Afghanistan.

References

Moths described in 1970
Odontiini
Taxa named by Hans Georg Amsel